Gataullin is a masculine surname of Tatar origin, its feminine counterpart is Gataullina. Notable people with the surname include:
Aksana Gataullina (born 2000), Russian pole vaulter
Milia Gataullina (born 1971), Russian graphic artist 
Radion Gataullin (born 1965), Soviet pole vaulter
Ruslan Gataullin (born 1979), Russian long jumper, brother of Radion

Russian-language surnames